

References
https://tudosobreplantas.wordpress.com/2009/05/15/arvores-simbolos-dos-estados-brasileiros/

Lists of trees
Trees
Trees
Brazil, Trees
State trees